Arulidae is a family of corals belonging to the order Alcyonacea.

Genera:
 Arula McFadden & van Ofwegen, 2012
 Bunga Lau & Reimer, 2019
 Hanah Lau, Stokvis, Ofwegen & Reimer, 2020
 Laeta Lau & Reimer, 2019

References

Cnidarian families
Stolonifera